The Alliance Francaise of Port Harcourt (French: l'Alliance Française de Port Harcourt) is a Nigerian institution in Port Harcourt, Rivers State devoted to training and educating people residing within or around the city in French language and culture. It commenced operations in 1983, and has served over 18,000 students since its establishment. Supported by the Government of Rivers State, the institution is affiliated with the worldwide network of over 800 Alliances.

Background
Due to increased enrollment and participation, the Alliance relocated its offices to the current site on Herbert Macaulay Street. The premises comprise a library, nine classrooms, including four with interactive whiteboards, a local restaurant, a terrace and an open-air auditorium that has a total capacity of more than 200 guests. The Alliance is run by a director, one deputy director (director of studies), about twenty teachers of French as a foreign language and more than 10 administrative staff.

See also

Alliance Française
Old GRA, Port Harcourt

References

External links
 Alliance Française de Port Harcourt web page

Culture in Port Harcourt
Education in Port Harcourt
Organizations based in Port Harcourt
1983 establishments in Nigeria
Alliance Française
Old GRA, Port Harcourt
Educational institutions established in 1983
European Nigerian culture in Rivers State
France–Nigeria relations